The National Fund of the Republic of Austria for Victims of National Socialism, is a fund created by the Republic of Austria to seek to apply restitution for property confiscated by the Nazis during World War II.  The fund was established in 1995.

The fund maintains databases of property, including the Art Database of the National Fund, held in the Wiener Stadtbibliothek.

General Settlement Fund

The General Settlement Fund is constituted to seek to compensate victims of Nazi persecution from all of the persecuted minorities, religious, cultural, ethnic, handicapped, and those who left Austria in order to escape persecution.  The claim for compensation passes to the heirs of the original victims on their death.

Applications to the General Settlement Fund closed in May 2003. In May 2010 final payments are being received from this fund.

On 26 April 2022, the Board of Trustees determined that the Fund had "completely fulfilled its tasks" and was dissolved.

National Fund

The National Fund is different from the General Fund in that it has different eligibility criteria and there is, in January 2009, no deadline for filing applications.

Notes

1995 establishments in Austria
Government of Austria
Aftermath of the Holocaust